Amara is a genus of carabid beetles containing 642 species.

Amara species

 Amara abbreviata (Chaudoir, 1842)
 Amara abdominalis (Motschulsky, 1844)
 Amara aberrans Baudi di Selva, 1864
 Amara aenea (DeGeer, 1774)
 Amara aeneola Poppius, 1906
 Amara aeneopolita Casey, 1918
 Amara affinis Dejean, 1828
 Amara africana Putzeys, 1872
 Amara agona Tschitscherine, 1898
 Amara ahngeriana Tschitscherine, 1903
 Amara aidereensis Hieke, 2002
 Amara aimonissabaudiae Baliani, 1932
 Amara alacris Tschitscherine, 1899
 Amara alaiensis Tschitscherine, 1894
 Amara albarracina Hieke, 1984
 Amara alecto Andrewes, 1930
 Amara alexandriensis Hieke, 1988
 Amara alpestris A. & G.B.Villa, 1833
 Amara alpicola Dejean, 1828
 Amara alpina (Paykull, 1790)
 Amara altiphila Hieke, 1995
 Amara altissima Hieke, 1981
 Amara ambulans Zimmermann, 1832
 Amara amnenkorensis Hieke, 2003
 Amara ampliata (Bates, 1873)
 Amara andreae Tschitscherine, 1898
 Amara andrewesi Baliani, 1932
 Amara androphoba Hieke, 2010
 Amara angustata (Say, 1823)
 Amara angustatoides Hieke, 2000
 Amara annapurnensis Hieke, 2006
 Amara anterolata Hieke, 2001
 Amara anthobia A. & G.B.Villa, 1833
 Amara anxia Tschitscherine, 1898
 Amara apachensis Casey, 1884
 Amara apricaria (Paykull, 1790)
 Amara arcticola Poppius, 1906
 Amara arcuata (Putzeys, 1865)
 Amara arenaria (Putzeys, 1865)
 Amara armeniaca (Motschulsky, 1839)
 Amara arnoldiana (Kryzhanovskij, 1974)
 Amara arrowi Baliani, 1934
 Amara arusiensis Hieke, 2007
 Amara asiatica Jedlicka, 1957
 Amara astrabadensis Lutshnik, 1935
 Amara astrophila Hieke, 2000
 Amara asymmetrica (Tanaka, 1957)
 Amara atlantis Antoine, 1925
 Amara aulica (Panzer, 1796)
 Amara aurata Dejean, 1828
 Amara aurichalcea Germar, 1823
 Amara avida (Say, 1823)
 Amara badakshana (Kryzhanovskij, 1974)
 Amara baimashanica Hieke, 2006
 Amara baimaxueshanica Hieke, 2010
 Amara balangshana Hieke, 1994
 Amara baliani Jedlicka, 1935
 Amara balkhashica (Kabak, 1993)
 Amara bamidunyae Bates, 1878
 Amara banghaasi Baliani, 1933
 Amara banjyangi Hieke, 2002
 Amara barcelonensis Hieke, 1983
 Amara basillaris (Say, 1823)
 Amara batesi Csiki, 1929
 Amara begemdirica Hieke, 1978
 Amara beicki Hieke, 1988
 Amara belfragei G.Horn, 1892
 Amara beresowskii Hieke, 2005
 Amara beybienkoi (Kryzhanovskij, 1974)
 Amara bhutanensis Hieke, 2011
 Amara biarticulata Motschulsky, 1844
 Amara bickhardti Sainte-Claire Deville, 1906
 Amara bicolorata Hieke, 2002
 Amara bifrons (Leonard Gyllenhaal|Gyllenhal]], 1810)
 Amara bilocata Hieke, 2013
 Amara birmana Baliani, 1934
 Amara bischoffi Jedlicka, 1946
 Amara bispinula Hieke, 1997
 Amara blanchardi Hayward, 1908
 Amara bokori Csiki, 1929
 Amara boreodzhungarica Kabak, 1990
 Amara boreosichuana Hieke, 2010
 Amara bowashanensis Hieke, 2007
 Amara bradyta Hieke, 1988
 Amara bradytoides (Reitter, 1889)
 Amara bradytonota Hieke, 2001
 Amara brevicollis (Chaudoir, 1850)
 Amara brevis Dejean, 1828
 Amara browni Lindroth, 1968
 Amara brucei Andrewes, 1923
 Amara brunnea (Leonard Gyllenhaal|Gyllenhal]], 1810)
 Amara bucharica Tschitscherine, 1898
 Amara cadoudali Morvan, 1977
 Amara calathoides (Putzeys, 1866)
 Amara californica Dejean, 1828
 Amara cameroni Baliani, 1934
 Amara cardionota Putzeys, 1878
 Amara cardionotoides Hieke, 1988
 Amara cardui Dejean, 1831
 Amara carexiphaga Hieke, 2003
 Amara carinata (LeConte, 1847)
 Amara castanea (Putzeys, 1866)
 Amara celioides Baliani, 1934
 Amara chaklaensis Hieke, 2003
 Amara chalcea Dejean, 1828
 Amara chalciope (Bates, 1891)
 Amara chalcites Dejean, 1828
 Amara chalcophaea Bates, 1873
 Amara chamdoensis Hieke, 2002
 Amara charchirensis Hieke, 1993
 Amara charis Andrewes, 1930
 Amara chaudoiri Schaum, 1858
 Amara chihuahuae (Casey, 1918)
 Amara chinensis Tschitscherine, 1894
 Amara chlorotica Fairmaire, 1867
 Amara chodjaii Morvan, 1975
 Amara cholashanensis Hieke, 2000
 Amara chormaensis Hieke, 1995
 Amara chumbiensis Hieke, 2003
 Amara clarkei Hieke, 1976
 Amara coarctiloba Hieke, 2010
 Amara coelebs Hayward, 1908
 Amara coiffaiti (Jeanne, 1981)
 Amara colasi Paulian & Villiers, 1939
 Amara collivaga Hieke, 1997
 Amara colvillensis Lindroth, 1968
 Amara communis (Panzer, 1796)
 Amara concinna Zimmermann, 1832
 Amara conflata LeConte, 1855
 Amara confusa LeConte, 1847
 Amara congrua A. Morawitz, 1862
 Amara conoidea (Putzeys, 1866)
 Amara consericea Hieke, 2002
 Amara constantini Binaghi, 1946
 Amara consularis (Duftschmid, 1812)
 Amara convexa LeConte, 1847
 Amara convexior Stephens, 1828
 Amara convexiuscula (Marsham, 1802)
 Amara coraica Kolbe, 1886
 Amara cordicollis Ménétriés, 1832
 Amara corpulenta (Putzeys, 1866)
 Amara cottyi Coquerel, 1859
 Amara crassispina LeConte, 1855
 Amara crenata Dejean, 1828
 Amara cretica Hieke, 2009
 Amara cribrata (Putzeys, 1866)
 Amara cribricollis (Chaudoir, 1846)
 Amara crystallina Tschitscherine, 1903
 Amara cubicollis Hieke, 1981
 Amara cuniculina Dejean, 1831
 Amara cupreolata Putzeys, 1866
 Amara cursitans Zimmermann, 1832
 Amara curta Dejean, 1828
 Amara curtonotoides Hieke, 2000
 Amara curvibasis Hieke, 2002
 Amara cyrenaica Baliani, 1928
 Amara dabashanica Hieke, 2002
 Amara dalijiashanica Hieke, 1997
 Amara dalmatina Dejean, 1828
 Amara danilevskyi (Kabak, 1993)
 Amara daochengensis Hieke, 2000
 Amara darjelingensis Putzeys, 1877
 Amara daurica (Motschulsky, 1844)
 Amara davatchii (Morvan, 1975)
 Amara davidi Tschitscherine, 1897
 Amara daxueshanensis Hieke, 2000
 Amara dentibasis Hieke, 1988
 Amara deparca (Say, 1830)
 Amara depressangula Poppius, 1908
 Amara dequensis Hieke, 1999
 Amara deserta (Krynicki, 1832)
 Amara deuvei Hieke, 1988
 Amara diabolica Hieke, 1988
 Amara diaphana Tschitscherine, 1894
 Amara dichroa Putzeys, 1870
 Amara dickorei Hieke, 1995
 Amara discors Kirby, 1837
 Amara disproportionalis Hieke, 1993
 Amara dissimilis Tschitscherine, 1894
 Amara distinguenda A. Morawitz, 1862
 Amara ditomoides (Putzeys, 1866)
 Amara doderoi Baliani, 1926
 Amara dolosa Say, 1834
 Amara dongolaensis Hieke, 1997
 Amara dostali Hieke, 2010
 Amara durangensis Van Dyke, 1943
 Amara dux Tschitscherine, 1894
 Amara dzhungarica (Kryzhanovskij, 1974)
 Amara elborzensis Hejkal, 2000
 Amara elegantula Tschitscherine, 1899
 Amara elevata (Motschulsky, 1844)
 Amara elgonica Alluaud, 1939
 Amara ellipsis (Casey, 1918)
 Amara emancipata Lindroth, 1968
 Amara emmanuelivivesi E.Vives, 2018
 Amara equestris (Duftschmid, 1812)
 Amara erberi Hieke, 2000
 Amara eremicola Kryzhanovskij, 1962
 Amara erratica (Duftschmid, 1812)
 Amara erythrocnema Dejean, 1828
 Amara escalerai Hejkal, 2008
 Amara espagnoli (Vives Duran, 1971)
 Amara eurynota (Panzer, 1796)
 Amara everesti Hieke, 2003
 Amara exarata Dejean, 1828
 Amara eximia Dejean, 1828
 Amara exlineae Minsk & Hatch, 1939
 Amara externefoveata Hieke, 2002
 Amara extrema Hieke, 1995
 Amara fairmairei Raffray, 1886
 Amara fairmaireoides Hieke, 1978
 Amara famelica Zimmermann, 1832
 Amara familiaris (Duftschmid, 1812)
 Amara farcta LeConte, 1855
 Amara fausti (Reitter, 1888)
 Amara fedtschenkoi Tschitscherine, 1898
 Amara fervida Coquerel, 1859
 Amara flebilis (Casey, 1918)
 Amara floralis Gaubil, 1844
 Amara fodinae Mannerheim, 1825
 Amara fortis LeConte, 1880
 Amara franzi Hieke, 1981
 Amara frigida (Putzeys, 1867)
 Amara fritzhiekei (Sundukov, 2013)
 Amara frivola (Bates, 1878)
 Amara fujiii Tanaka, 1959
 Amara fulva (O.F. Müller, 1776)
 Amara fulvipes (Audinet-Serville, 1821)
 Amara fusca Dejean, 1828
 Amara fusgenua Hieke, 1999
 Amara gangotriensis Hieke, 1988
 Amara gansuensis Jedlicka, 1957
 Amara gartokiensis Hieke, 1988
 Amara gebleri Dejean, 1831
 Amara gerdmuelleri Hieke, 2010
 Amara gibba (LeConte, 1847)
 Amara gigantea (Motschulsky, 1844)
 Amara glabella Hieke, 1981
 Amara glabrata Dejean, 1828
 Amara glabricollis Jedlicka, 1938
 Amara glacialis (Mannerheim, 1853)
 Amara glebi Kabak, 2010
 Amara gobialtaica Hieke, 2000
 Amara golmudensis Hieke, 2004
 Amara goniodera Tschitscherine, 1895
 Amara gorevillei Hieke, 1970
 Amara gottelandi Antoine, 1931
 Amara gravidula Rosenhauer, 1856
 Amara hamadanensis Hejkal, 2008
 Amara hanhaica Tschitscherine, 1894
 Amara hannemanni Hieke, 1991
 Amara harpalina LeConte, 1855
 Amara harpaloides Dejean, 1828
 Amara harpalonota Hieke, 2001
 Amara hartmanni Hieke, 1997
 Amara haywardi Csiki, 1929
 Amara hedjazica Hieke, 1988
 Amara heinzorum Hieke, 1997
 Amara hejkali Hieke, 2008
 Amara helva Tschitscherine, 1898
 Amara hengduanshanica Hieke, 2002
 Amara hermoniensis Hieke, 1997
 Amara heterolata Hieke, 1997
 Amara hicksi Lindroth, 1968
 Amara hidakana (Habu, 1972)
 Amara hiekei (Kryzhanovskij & Mikhailov, 1987)
 Amara hiekeposthuma Marggi & C.Huber, 2017
 Amara hingstoni Baliani, 1934
 Amara hiogoensis (Bates, 1873)
 Amara histrio Andrewes, 1930
 Amara humerangula Hieke, 1995
 Amara hyalina Semenov, 1889
 Amara hyperborea Dejean, 1831
 Amara hypsela Andrewes, 1923
 Amara hypseloides Baliani, 1934
 Amara hypsophila Antoine, 1953
 Amara idahoana (Casey, 1924)
 Amara ignatovitschi Tschitscherine, 1894
 Amara impuncticollis (Say, 1823)
 Amara incrassata Baliani, 1934
 Amara inexspectata Hieke, 1990
 Amara infima (Duftschmid, 1812)
 Amara infuscata (Putzeys, 1866)
 Amara ingenua (Duftschmid, 1812)
 Amara insignis Dejean, 1831
 Amara insularis G.Horn, 1875
 Amara interfluviatilis Hieke, 2010
 Amara interstitialis Dejean, 1828
 Amara involans Hieke, 2000
 Amara iranica Kryzhanovskij, 1968
 Amara irkuteana Jedlicka, 1957
 Amara irkutensis Baliani, 1934
 Amara isajevi Kabak, 2008
 Amara isfahanensis Hieke, 1993
 Amara iturupensis Lafer, 1978
 Amara jacobina LeConte, 1855
 Amara jajalaensis Hieke, 1995
 Amara jannui Hieke, 1988
 Amara jintangensis Hieke, 2005
 Amara jordanica Hieke, 2002
 Amara juldusiensis Hieke, 1988
 Amara jumlana Hieke, 1981
 Amara junkarensis Hieke, 2012
 Amara kabakovi Hieke, 1976
 Amara kadyrbekovi (Kabak, 1991)
 Amara kailasensis Hieke, 1997
 Amara kampalaensis Hieke, 1997
 Amara kandbarica Hieke, 2007
 Amara kangdingensis Hieke, 1997
 Amara kangtissuensis Hieke, 2003
 Amara karalangana Hieke, 1996
 Amara karolana Hieke, 2003
 Amara karolanella Hieke, 2003
 Amara karzhantavensis (Kabak, 1991)
 Amara kaszabiella Hieke, 1983
 Amara kataevi (Sundukov, 2001)
 Amara katajewi Hieke, 2000
 Amara kavanaughi Hieke, 1990
 Amara kenzanensis (Ishida & Shibata, 1961)
 Amara kermanensis Hejkal, 2008
 Amara khoramabadensis Hejkal, 2008
 Amara khumbuensis Hieke, 2002
 Amara kilimandjarica Alluaud, 1927
 Amara kingdoni Baliani, 1934
 Amara kingdonoides Hieke, 2002
 Amara kinitzi Tschitscherine, 1899
 Amara kirghisica Kryzhanovskij, 1962
 Amara kiritshenkoi (Kryzhanovskij, 1974)
 Amara klapperichi Jedlicka, 1956
 Amara klausnitzeri Hieke, 2014
 Amara kocheri Antoine, 1933
 Amara kochi Baliani, 1940
 Amara kosagatschi Hieke, 1988
 Amara koslowi Hieke, 2010
 Amara krueperi Apfelbeck, 1904
 Amara kryshanowskii Hieke, 1976
 Amara kuenlunensis (Bates, 1878)
 Amara kulti Fassati, 1947
 Amara kurnakowi Hieke, 1994
 Amara kutscherai Hieke, 2006
 Amara lacustris LeConte, 1855
 Amara laevipennis Kirby, 1837
 Amara laevissima J.Sahlberg, 1880
 Amara laferi Hieke, 1976
 Amara lamia Andrewes, 1924
 Amara langtangensis Hieke, 2002
 Amara lantoscana Fauvel, 1888
 Amara laoshanensis Hieke, 2002
 Amara larisae (Sundukov, 2001)
 Amara laticarpa Bates, 1873
 Amara latior (Kirby, 1837)
 Amara latithorax Baliani, 1934
 Amara ledouxi Hieke, 1988
 Amara leleupi Basilewsky, 1962
 Amara lhatsensis Hieke, 2003
 Amara lhozhangensis Hieke, 2008
 Amara lindrothi Hieke, 1990
 Amara liouvillei Antoine, 1936
 Amara litangensis Hieke, 1994
 Amara littoralis Mannerheim, 1843
 Amara littorea C.G.Thomson, 1857
 Amara loeffleri Jedlicka, 1963
 Amara longula LeConte, 1855
 Amara lopatini Kryzhanovskij, 1968
 Amara lucens Baliani, 1943
 Amara lucida (Duftschmid, 1812)
 Amara lucidissima Baliani, 1932
 Amara lugens Zimmermann, 1832
 Amara lugubris (Casey, 1918)
 Amara lukasi Hejkal, 2002
 Amara lunicollis Schiødte, 1837
 Amara luppovae (Kryzhanovskij, 1962)
 Amara lutescens (Reitter, 1888)
 Amara lyrata Hieke, 1981
 Amara macronota (Solsky, 1875)
 Amara macros (Bates, 1883)
 Amara macrovata Hieke, 2009
 Amara magniceps Hieke, 1993
 Amara magnicollis Tschitscherine, 1894
 Amara maindroni Bedel, 1907
 Amara mairei Peyerimhoff, 1922
 Amara majuscula (Chaudoir, 1850)
 Amara makolskii Roubal, 1923
 Amara malacensis Hieke, 1983
 Amara manasluensis Hieke, 1997
 Amara mandarina Baliani, 1932
 Amara maoshanica Hieke, 2010
 Amara markamensis Hieke, 2000
 Amara martensi Hieke, 1981
 Amara medvedevi (Kryzhanovskij, 1974)
 Amara megacephala Gebler, 1830
 Amara merula (Casey, 1918)
 Amara messae Baliani, 1924
 Amara metallescens (Zimmermann, 1831)
 Amara metallicolor Hieke, 2010
 Amara micantula Hieke, 1994
 Amara microdera (Chaudoir, 1844)
 Amara microphthalma Baliani, 1943
 Amara mikae Lafer, 1980
 Amara milalaensis Hieke, 1997
 Amara mimetica Hieke, 2003
 Amara mimobeicki Hieke, 2010
 Amara minshanica Hieke, 1997
 Amara minuta (Motschulsky, 1844)
 Amara misella L.Miller, 1868
 Amara misera Tschitscherine, 1894
 Amara mixaltaica Hieke, 2000
 Amara moerens Zimmermann, 1832
 Amara molinar Hieke, 2010
 Amara molopiformis Kryzhanovskij, 1964
 Amara monastirensis Hieke, 2005
 Amara mondalaensis Hieke, 1997
 Amara monochroa Hieke, 2004
 Amara montana Dejean, 1828
 Amara montivaga Sturm, 1825
 Amara mopsa Hieke, 2000
 Amara morio Ménétriés, 1832
 Amara muchei Jedlicka, 1962
 Amara mukusensis Hieke, 1997
 Amara muliensis Hieke, 2000
 Amara multipunctata (Kabak, 1997)
 Amara municipalis (Duftschmid, 1812)
 Amara murgabica Tschitscherine, 1902
 Amara musculis (Say, 1823)
 Amara myanmarica Hieke, 2005
 Amara nataliae (Kryzhanovskij, 1974)
 Amara nebrioides (Kryzhanovskij, 1974)
 Amara necinfima Hieke, 2000
 Amara negrei Hieke, 1976
 Amara neomexicana (Casey, 1924)
 Amara neoscotica Casey, 1924
 Amara nepalensis Hieke, 1981
 Amara nexa (Casey, 1918)
 Amara nigricornis C.G.Thomson, 1857
 Amara nikolajewi Hieke, 1999
 Amara nila Andrewes, 1924
 Amara nitida Sturm, 1825
 Amara nobilis (Duftschmid, 1812)
 Amara notha Antoine, 1936
 Amara nyingtriensis Hieke, 2000
 Amara obesa (Say, 1823)
 Amara obscuripes Bates, 1873
 Amara obtusangula Baliani, 1934
 Amara occidentalis Hieke, 2002
 Amara ochracea (Gautier des Cottes, 1868)
 Amara oertzeni Hieke, 1984
 Amara ondai Morita, 1995
 Amara ooptera (Putzeys, 1865)
 Amara orienticola Lutshnik, 1935
 Amara otini Antoine, 1938
 Amara otiosa Casey, 1918
 Amara ovata (Fabricius, 1792)
 Amara ovicephala Hieke, 2002
 Amara ovtshinnikovi (Kabak, 1993)
 Amara oxiana Tschitscherine, 1898
 Amara pakistana Jedlicka, 1963
 Amara pallidula (Motschulsky, 1844)
 Amara pallipes Kirby, 1837
 Amara parkeri Baliani, 1934
 Amara parvicollis Gebler, 1833
 Amara patruelis Dejean, 1831
 Amara paumashanica Hieke, 1997
 Amara peculiaris Tschitscherine, 1894
 Amara pennsylvanica Hayward, 1908
 Amara perabdita Antoine, 1941
 Amara petrimontii Hieke, 1995
 Amara pingshiangi Jedlicka, 1957
 Amara pinguis Andrewes, 1930
 Amara pisangana Hieke, 1995
 Amara platynota Hieke, 1994
 Amara plebeja (Leonard Gyllenhaal|Gyllenhal]], 1810)
 Amara poggii Hieke, 1999
 Amara pomona Casey, 1918
 Amara potanini Tschitscherine, 1894
 Amara praetermissa (C.R.Sahlberg, 1827)
 Amara propinqua Ménétriés, 1832
 Amara proxima Putzeys, 1866
 Amara pseudobrunnea Lindroth, 1968
 Amara pseudocoraica Hieke, 2002
 Amara pseudofulva Ali, 1967
 Amara pseudoleleupi Hieke, 1976
 Amara pseudosimplicidens Lafer, 1980
 Amara pterostichina Hayward, 1908
 Amara pueli Antoine, 1923
 Amara pulchra Baliani, 1943
 Amara pulpani Kult, 1949
 Amara pumilio (Piochard de la Brûlerie, 1876)
 Amara puncticollis Dejean, 1828
 Amara punctipennis (Reitter, 1889)
 Amara pyrenaea Dejean, 1828
 Amara qinghaiensis Hieke, 2012
 Amara quenseli (Schönherr, 1806)
 Amara radjabii (Morvan, 1975)
 Amara rectangula LeConte, 1855
 Amara reflexicollis Motschulsky, 1844
 Amara refulgens (Reiche, 1875)
 Amara reichei Coquerel, 1859
 Amara reitteri Tschitscherine, 1894
 Amara religiosa Hieke, 2003
 Amara retingensis Hieke & J.Schmidt, 2009
 Amara robusta Baliani, 1932
 Amara rotundangula Hieke, 2002
 Amara rotundata Dejean, 1828
 Amara rotundicollis (L.Schaufuss, 1862)
 Amara rubens Tschitscherine, 1898
 Amara rubrica Haldeman, 1843
 Amara rufescens (Dejean, 1829)
 Amara rufipes Dejean, 1828
 Amara rufoaenea Dejean, 1828
 Amara rugulifera Hieke, 2002
 Amara rupicola Zimmermann, 1832
 Amara sabulosa (Audinet-Serville, 1821)
 Amara sachiana Hieke, 2003
 Amara saginata (Ménétriés, 1848)
 Amara samnitica A.Fiori, 1899
 Amara sanjuanensis Hatch, 1949
 Amara sankhuana Hieke, 1990
 Amara saphyrea Dejean, 1828
 Amara sawadai Hieke, 1994
 Amara saxicola Zimmermann, 1832
 Amara schawalleri Hieke, 1990
 Amara schilenkovi Hieke, 1988
 Amara schimperi Wencker, 1866
 Amara schmidti Hieke, 1994
 Amara schwarzi Hayward, 1908
 Amara schweigeri Hieke, 1997
 Amara scitula Zimmermann, 1832
 Amara sera Say, 1830
 Amara serdicana Apfelbeck, 1904
 Amara sericea Jedlicka, 1953
 Amara shaanxiensis Hieke, 2002
 Amara shahristana (Kryzhanovskij & Mikhailov, 1987)
 Amara shalulishanica Hieke & Kavanaugh, 2012
 Amara shinanensis (Habu, 1953)
 Amara shirazica Hejkal, 2008
 Amara shogulaensis Hieke, 1997
 Amara sichotana Lafer, 1978
 Amara sicula Dejean, 1831
 Amara sifanica Tschitscherine, 1894
 Amara sifanicoides Hieke, 2010
 Amara sikkimensis Andrewes, 1930
 Amara silfverbergi Hieke, 1996
 Amara silvestrii Baliani, 1937
 Amara simikotensis Hieke, 2002
 Amara similata (Leonard Gyllenhaal|Gyllenhal]], 1810)
 Amara simplex Dejean, 1828
 Amara simplicidens A. Morawitz, 1863
 Amara singularis Tschitscherine, 1894
 Amara sinuaticollis A. Morawitz, 1862
 Amara sinuosa (Casey, 1918)
 Amara skopini Hieke, 1976
 Amara sodalicia Casey, 1924
 Amara sogdiana (Kryzhanovskij, 1974)
 Amara sollicita Pantel, 1888
 Amara solskyi (Heyden, 1880)
 Amara somoni Jedlicka, 1968
 Amara songarica Putzeys, 1866
 Amara spectabilis Schaum, 1858
 Amara splendens Andrewes, 1926
 Amara spreta Dejean, 1831
 Amara spuria Lindroth, 1968
 Amara strandi Lutshnik, 1933
 Amara strenua Zimmermann, 1832
 Amara stricticeps Baliani, 1932
 Amara stulta Lutshnik, 1935
 Amara subconvexa Putzeys, 1865
 Amara subdepressa (Putzeys, 1866)
 Amara sublimis Andrewes, 1930
 Amara sublustris Tschitscherine, 1898
 Amara subplanata (Putzeys, 1866)
 Amara sundukowi Hieke, 2002
 Amara superans Wollaston, 1854
 Amara susamyrensis Hieke, 1988
 Amara szekessyi Jedlicka, 1953
 Amara tachypoda Tschitscherine, 1898
 Amara taguensis Hieke, 2005
 Amara taiwanica Hieke, 1999
 Amara taniantawengensis Hieke, 2005
 Amara tartariae (Bates, 1878)
 Amara taurica (Motschulsky, 1844)
 Amara tenax Casey, 1918
 Amara tenebrionella (Bates, 1882)
 Amara termaberensis Hieke, 2007
 Amara texana (Putzeys, 1866)
 Amara thibetana Tschitscherine, 1894
 Amara thoracica Hayward, 1908
 Amara thorongiensis Hieke, 1990
 Amara tibialis (Paykull, 1798)
 Amara torrida (Panzer, 1796)
 Amara tragbaliensis Hieke, 1990
 Amara transberingiensis Hieke, 2002
 Amara transiliensis (Kryzhanovskij, 1974)
 Amara tricuspidata Dejean, 1831
 Amara tschitscherinella Hieke, 1990
 Amara tumida A. Morawitz, 1862
 Amara tuntalashanica Hieke, 2002
 Amara turbata Casey, 1918
 Amara turcica Hieke, 1976
 Amara turcmenica Tschitscherine, 1894
 Amara turkestana (Kryzhanovskij, 1974)
 Amara uhligi Holdhaus, 1904
 Amara ussuriensis Lutshnik, 1935
 Amara vagans Tschitscherine, 1897
 Amara validipes (Tschitscherine, 1888)
 Amara validula Tschitscherine, 1898
 Amara vecors Tschitscherine, 1899
 Amara violacea Motschulsky, 1844
 Amara viridescens Reitter, 1883
 Amara vivesi (Jeanne, 1985)
 Amara vixdentata (Tanaka, 1959)
 Amara vlasovi Kryzhanovskij, 1962
 Amara volatilis (Casey, 1918)
 Amara walterheinzi Hieke, 1988
 Amara weiperti Hieke, 1997
 Amara weiratheri Baliani, 1935
 Amara wengdaensis Hieke, 2010
 Amara wittmeri Hieke, 1981
 Amara wrasei Hieke, 1988
 Amara xueshanica Hieke, 2006
 Amara yangpachensis Hieke, 1997
 Amara yasujensis Hejkal, 2008
 Amara yeti Hieke, 2002
 Amara yulongensis Hieke, 2005
 Amara yupeiyuae Hieke, 2000
 Amara yushuana Hieke, 2012
 Amara yushuensis Hieke, 2003
 Amara zagrosensis (Morvan, 1973)
 Amara zhanglaensis Hieke, 2012
 Amara zhegushanica Hieke, 2005
 Amara zhongdianica Hieke, 1997
 † Amara boryslavica Lomnicki, 1894
 † Amara cockerelli Wickham, 1912
 † Amara danae Scudder, 1900
 † Amara forsteri Handlirsch, 1906
 † Amara pinguicula Heer, 1862
 † Amara powellii Scudder, 1900
 † Amara primigenia Heer, 1862
 † Amara princeps Heer, 1862
 † Amara procera Forster, 1891
 † Amara revocata Scudder, 1900
 † Amara sterilis Scudder, 1900
 † Amara veterata Scudder, 1900

References

Amara